Dame Kerry Leigh Prendergast  (née Ferrier, born 28 March 1953) is a New Zealand politician who served as the 33rd Mayor of Wellington between 2001 and 2010, succeeding Mark Blumsky. She was the second woman to hold the position, after Fran Wilde.

Early life
Prendergast was born in Christchurch but grew up in Tawa, attending Tawa College (1966–69), where she was captain of the college netball team. She qualified as a registered nurse and then trained as a midwife and was later awarded the Royal New Zealand Plunket Society Long Service Award in 1991. She has also been a voluntary grief counsellor. She holds a MBA degree from Victoria University of Wellington.

Local-body politics

Prendergast started her political life as a Tawa Borough councillor in 1986. In 1989 she was elected to Wellington City Council and was re-elected every three years until 2010. In 1995 Prendergast became Deputy Mayor to Mark Blumsky.

In the 1999 general election Prendergast stood as a National list candidate, ranked 30th on the party's list. However, the National Party did not gain enough of the party vote for Prendergast to enter Parliament. She considered running again at the 2002 election, but in 2001 Mark Blumsky announced his intention not to run for the mayoralty again, and endorsed Prendergast's mayoralty candidacy.

Prendergast was elected mayor in 2001 and re-elected in 2004 and 2007. During her time as Mayor, Prendergast instigated the policy of making Wellington the "Creative Capital". She has endorsed changing the Flag of New Zealand.

In the 2010 Wellington City mayoral election, Prendergast was challenged by Green Party city councillor Celia Wade-Brown for the Wellington mayoralty. After the counting of special votes, Wade-Brown was declared the winner by a 176-vote margin, ending nearly a decade of Prendergast's mayoralty.

Other roles
In 2011 she became chair of the Environmental Protection Authority and of the Tourism Board. She is on the board of Kirkaldie and Stains Ltd, WorkSafe NZ, Phoenix Football Club, and is on several advisory boards.

Prendergast was Vice President of Local Government New Zealand and a trustee of the Joe Aspell Trust during her time as Mayor. She has been executive chair of the New Zealand International Festival of the Arts since 2011. She was a director of Wellington International Airport Limited and the Wellington Region Association of Midwives until 2010.  She is an honorary life member of the Katherine Mansfield Birthplace Society and of Plunket.

In 2015 Prendergast accepted the role of ambassador for Alzheimer's New Zealand, having had personal experience of the disease - both her late father Denis and her mother Beverley Ferrier suffered the disease.

Honours and awards

In the 2011 Queen's Birthday Honours, Prendergast was appointed a Companion of the New Zealand Order of Merit, for services to local-body affairs, and in the 2019 New Year Honours, she was promoted to Dame Companion of the New Zealand Order of Merit, for services to governance and the community.

In 2014, Prendergast received the New Zealand Women of Influence Award in the local and regional category.

Personal life 
Prendergast is married and has two daughters. Her son, Andrew, was killed on 31 March 2011 in a riding accident.

References

External links
Kerry Prendergast in 2000 next to mayor Mark Blumsky (photo)
  from 2005
 Wellington City Council – Mayor Prendergast
 Farewell statement from Wellington City Council
 Profile at City Mayors

|-

1953 births
Dames Companion of the New Zealand Order of Merit
Living people
Mayors of Wellington
Deputy mayors of Wellington
Wellington City Councillors
New Zealand justices of the peace
New Zealand nurses
Women mayors of places in New Zealand
Victoria University of Wellington alumni
New Zealand National Party politicians
New Zealand midwives
Unsuccessful candidates in the 1999 New Zealand general election
New Zealand Women of Influence Award recipients
People educated at Tawa College
New Zealand women nurses